Live at Omeara is the second live album by English singer-songwriter Freya Ridings. It was released in the United Kingdom on 30 March 2018 by Good Soldier.

Background
The album is a live recording of the full setlist from the Ridings' performance at the Omeara in London in January 2018. On Facebook, Ridings' said, "Thank you so much everyone who came to Omeara last week and made it such a special night. Here's some memories from the day and a bit of my performance of Lost Without You. It was so lovely to meet you all afterwards, I'm feeling unbelievably blessed by all of this."

Track listing

Charts

Release history

References

2018 live albums
Freya Ridings albums